Hanabusa Itchō II (二代英一蝶, Nidai Hanabusa Icchō) (1677–1737) was the son and pupil of Japanese painter Hanabusa Itchō. He was also known as Hanabusa Taga, Nobukatsu, Chōhachi, and Mohachi.

References
Lane, Richard (1978). "Images of the Floating World." Old Saybrook, CT: Konecky & Konecky.

Hanabusa Itcho 2
1677 births
1737 deaths